Shevchik or Shefchik may be an English-language respelling or transliteration of the following surnames of the same origin:

 Ševčík, from Czech and Slovak
 Szewczyk, from Polish
 Шевчик, from Ukrainian and Russian

Shevchik or Shefchik may refer to:
 Byron Shefchik (born 1974), American swimmer
 Dan Shevchik (born 1980), American swimmer
 Rick Shefchik (born 1952), American writer

See also
 
 Shevchuk

Occupational surnames